The Hotel Del Monte was a large resort hotel in Monterey, California, from its opening in 1880 until 1942. It was one of the finest luxury hotels in North America. During World War II, it closed and the building was leased to the United States Navy. It was first used by the Navy as a school where enlisted men spent the second, third, and fourth months of an eleven-month course being trained as electronic technicians. Later the Hotel Del Monte became the Naval Postgraduate School.  Today, the building is called Herrmann Hall. It contains school administrative offices and the Navy Gateway Inns and Suites, a hotel.

History 

Charles Crocker, one of California's Big Four railroad barons, established the resort through Southern Pacific Railroad's property division, Pacific Improvement Company (PIC), and opened the first hotel June 3, 1880. The first true resort complex in the United States, it was an immediate success.  Nearby, along Monterey Bay, was a railroad depot where the Del Monte (named for the hotel) served patrons arriving by train.

The property extended south and southeast of the hotel and included gardens, parkland, polo grounds, a race track, and a golf course. Originally used for hunting and other outdoor activities, the hotel's property became Pebble Beach, an unincorporated resort community, and the world-famous Pebble Beach Golf Links. The famous 17-Mile Drive was originally designed as a local excursion for visitors to the Del Monte to take in the historic sights of Monterey and Pacific Grove and the scenery of what would become Pebble Beach.  The hotel became popular with the wealthy and influential of the day, and guests included Theodore Roosevelt and Ernest Hemingway, as well as many early Hollywood stars.

The St. John's Chapel, Del Monte was built in 1891 by Charles Crocker and Collis P. Huntington for guests staying at the Hotel Del Monte.

On February 27, 1919 Samuel Finley Brown Morse formed the Del Monte Properties Company, and acquired the extensive holdings of the Pacific Improvement Company, which included the Del Monte Forest, the Del Monte Lodge (since renamed the Lodge at Pebble Beach), and the Hotel Del Monte.

The hotel's shops included branches of Gump's, I. Magnin and City of Paris.

There have been three buildings on the same site.  The first building was designed by architect Arthur Brown Sr., who had been the Southern Pacific Railroad's Superintendent of Bridges and Buildings.  It was destroyed by fire on June 1, 1887 and was replaced. The El Carmelo Hotel in Pacific Grove was built by (PIC) in 1887, and was sometimes called the sister hotel of the Hotel Del Monte. Two guests were killed and the hotel damaged in the 1906 San Francisco earthquake. Humorist Josh Billings died at the hotel in 1885. 

The Del Monte Golf Course opened in 1897 as a public club. The Del Monte Cup championships were played at the Del Monte Golf Course beginning in 1898, and was open for men and women. It is one the oldest continuously operating golf course in the United States. The first Pacific Coast Golf Association Women's Championship and the first PCGA Open were held at the Del Monte Golf Course. 

The Hotel’s famed Art Gallery, which was established in 1907 and quickly became the venue for California's most prestigious artists, was also rebuilt; according to the detailed eyewitness account of Carmel artist Jennie V. Cannon, the space for exhibiting art was expanded.

Also on the grounds are nine additional structures including the Roman Plunge Pool Complex, built in 1918 and designed by Hobart and Tantau, later the architects of the third hotel building. The pool itself was designed by Hobart. The Roman Plunge Solarium was restored in 2012 by architect James D. McCord. At that time the main Plunge was reconstructed as a reflecting pool and its original above-ground finishes restored. The Arizona Garden (1882), originally designed by landscape architect Rudolph Ulrich, is also on the grounds.

Del Monte Foods traces its name back to an Oakland, California food distributor who used the brand name "Del Monte" for a premium coffee blend made especially for the hotel.

On September 27, 1924, the second of three hotels, Hotel Del Monte building was destroyed by fire. The property surrounding the hotel became known as Pebble Beach, now a world-renowned resort and golf course.

The current building dates from 1926. It was designed by architects Lewis P. Hobart and Clarence A. Tantau.  

The Hotel Del Monte was requisitioned by the Navy at the beginning of World War II and used as a pre-flight training school. In 1947, the U.S. Navy purchased the hotel and its surrounding 627 acres for $2.5 million.  In 1951 the United States Naval Academy's postgraduate school moved from Annapolis, Maryland, to its new location—the former Hotel del Monte. The hotel is now Herrmann Hall, the central building of the Naval Postgraduate School.

See also
 Del Monte Foods

References

External links
 Naval Postgraduate School
 Historic photographs from the Naval Postgraduate School, many include the Hotel Del Monte
 Navy Gateway Inns and Suites, Monterey
 “On the Monterey Peninsula” (Hotel Del Monte), Shapes of Clay, Gladding, McBean & Co. & Los Angeles Pressed Brick Co., Vol. 2, No. 7, August 1926, pp. 2-11.

Naval Postgraduate School
Buildings and structures in Monterey, California
Defunct hotels in California